Karel Vaněk (19 May 1895 – 24 February 1958), was a Czech chess player, unofficial Chess Olympiad team gold medal winner (1924).

Biography
In the first half of the 1920s Karel Vaněk was one of Czechoslovakia's leading chess players. He has lived in Brno and participated in team tournaments with the local chess club. In 1923, in Pardubice Karel Vaněk won a bronze medal in Czechoslovak Chess Championship. In 1924, in Paris Karel Vaněk represented the Czechoslovakia team in 1st unofficial Chess Olympiad, where he won a gold medal in team competition.

References

External links

Karel Vaněk chess games at 365chess.com

1895 births
1958 deaths
Czechoslovak chess players
Czech chess players
Chess Olympiad competitors
20th-century chess players